Artyom Alekseyevich Zakharov (born 27 October 1991) is a Kazakhstani cyclist, who currently rides for UCI WorldTeam . He competed at the 2012 UCI Track Cycling World Championships and 2013 UCI Track Cycling World Championships. He won the silver medal in the omnium at the 2016 Asian Cycling Championships.

The leader of the national team of Kazakhstan on track. Champion of Asia and Prize-winner of World Cups. Record holder of Asia in individual pursuit on 4 km and fast circle of 250 m. The winner of Asian games 2017 in Ashgabat in team 4 km pursuit race. The silver medal winner Asian games to Ashgabat 2017 in the race Omnium

Major results

Track

2012
 Asian Track Championships
2nd  Madison
3rd  Team pursuit
2013
 1st  Omnium, Asian Track Championships
 3rd  Omnium, 2013–14 UCI Track Cycling World Cup, Aguascalientes
2015
 3rd  Omnium, Asian Track Championships
2016
 2nd  Omnium, Asian Track Championships
 3rd  Omnium, 2015–16 UCI Track Cycling World Cup, Hong Kong
2017
 Asian Indoor and Martial Arts Games
1st  Team pursuit
2nd  Omnium
 Asian Track Championships
2nd  Individual pursuit
2nd  Omnium
2018
 Asian Games
3rd  Individual pursuit
3rd  Omnium
 Asian Track Championships
3rd  Individual pursuit
3rd  Omnium
2019
 Asian Track Championships
2nd  Points race
3rd  Team pursuit
 3rd  Omnium, 2019–20 UCI Track Cycling World Cup, Cambridge
2020
 Asian Track Championships
2nd  Omnium
3rd  Madison

Road

2012
 5th Overall Tour of Vietnam
2013
 8th Overall Tour de Serbie
2015
 5th Time trial, National Road Championships
 7th Grand Prix des Marbriers
 10th Maykop–Ulyap–Maykop
2016
 5th Time trial, National Road Championships
2017
 National Road Championships
1st  Road race
3rd Time trial
2018
 3rd Road race, National Road Championships
2019
 1st  Team time trial, Asian Road Championships
 5th Road race, National Road Championships
2021
 4th Time trial, National Road Championships
2022
 2nd Road race, National Road Championships

References

External links

1991 births
Living people
Kazakhstani track cyclists
Kazakhstani male cyclists
Place of birth missing (living people)
Cyclists at the 2014 Asian Games
Cyclists at the 2018 Asian Games
Asian Games medalists in cycling
Olympic cyclists of Kazakhstan
Cyclists at the 2016 Summer Olympics
Cyclists at the 2020 Summer Olympics
Medalists at the 2018 Asian Games
Asian Games bronze medalists for Kazakhstan
People from Petropavl
Kazakhstani people of Russian descent